The Santoña Agreement, or Pact of Santoña, was an agreement signed in the town of Guriezo, near Santoña, Cantabria, on 24 August 1937, during the Spanish Civil War, between politicians close to the Basque Nationalist Party, fighting for the Spanish Republicans, and Italian forces, fighting for Francisco Franco.

During the Battle of Santander, the Francoist troops pierced through the Republican defense lines. The Republican troops, including the Basque army, retreated to the west in a disorderly fashion, with numerous desertions.

After the fall of Bilbao, almost all of Basque territory had fallen into Franco's hands. Juan de Ajuriaguerra, the president of the Biscay Regional Council of the PNV, negotiated a surrender agreement with the Italian army command. The PNV offered to surrender the Basque army in exchange of its prisoners being treated as prisoners-of-war under Italian command and PNV members being allowed to go to exile on British ships.  

The Basque nationalist units of the Republican army in the Basque territory, fighting under the direction of Basque President José Antonio Aguirre, met at Santoña and surrendered to the Italian forces on 24 August. When news of the agreement arrived to his headquarters, Franco cancelled the agreement and ordered the immediate jailing of the 22,000 captured soldiers in Santoña's El Dueso Prison. Three months later, around half of them had been freed, and the other half remained in prison, and 510 were sentenced to death, a smaller reprisal proportion than registered elsewhere. Ajuriaguerra, the highest rank in the PNV, was released from prison in 1943.  

Because the agreement was carried out by the PNV behind the Republican government's back, the agreement is also known as the Santoña Treason.

See also
Military history of Spain

References

Bibliography
Cándano, Xuan. El pacto de Santoña (1937): La rendición del nacionalismo vasco al fascismo (Madrid: La Esfera de los Libros, 2006)  (Spanish)
Granja Sainz, J.L. de la, Entre el pacto de San Sebastián y el de Santoña (1930-1937) (Madrid: Historia 16, 1998). 271 (Spanish)

Battles of the Spanish Civil War
Conflicts in 1937
1937 in Spain
1937 in politics
History of Cantabria
Basque history
Battles involving Italy
1937 treaties